LIFX (pronounced Life-X) is a line of energy-efficient, multi-color, Wi-Fi enabled, digital addressable LED light bulbs that can be controlled via a Wi-Fi equipped device such as a smartphone or smartwatch.

History 
LIFX was originally manufactured by LiFi Labs, a San Francisco-based company founded by the Australian inventor Phil Bosua. LiFi Labs introduced the idea of smart lighting on Kickstarter, before any alternative products could be found in market, and have since attracted large attention. Consequently, the company managed to raise $1.3 million in public funding, followed by a $12 million series A investment round in mid 2014. LIFX was also one of the first products to participate in the Works with Nest program.  

On February 3, 2015, LIFX 2.0 was launched.  This included IFTTT integration, remote access and an Android Wear app.  In April 2015, LIFX was renamed LIFX Original; two new products were launched at that time, expanding the range to include a tunable white light, the White 800 and the Color 650. By May 16, 2015, the LIFX iOS app had added support for the Apple Watch. 

On October 1, 2016 the third generation LIFX bulbs shipped, including the flagship 'flat top' bulb reminiscent of the original A19 product, as well as BR30 bulbs, a GU10 track light, a LIFX Downlight, the LIFX+ bulbs (a bulb that added an infrared channel to allow boosted security vision for cameras through glass, down long passages and across longer distances) and the hugely popular LIFX Z light strips. 

In September 2017 support was added for Apple HomeKit. In November 2017 the company released the LIFX Mini bulbs, LIFX Beam, a modular set of LED bars that join with magnetic connections, and the LIFX Tiles, another module smart feature light for LED wall displays and ambient lighting. These were an early example of LIFX's polychrome technology going beyond their original use in the light strip, with the Tile using an array of LEDs to create many addressable areas within the one 'light' and enabling new effects and features in the smart lighting space.

LIFX was acquired by ASX listed Buddy Technologies (BUD) in early 2019.

The assets of LIFX were acquired by Feit Electric in August 2022.

Products

LIFX A19 
The LIFX A19 is a Wi-Fi enabled LED downlight with millions of colors and many shades of white controlled using a Wi-Fi enabled device.

LIFX BR30 
The LIFX BR30 is a Wi-Fi enabled flood light with millions of colors and many shades of white controlled using a Wi-Fi enabled device.

LIFX GU10 
The LIFX GU10 is a Wi-Fi enabled track light fixture with millions of colors and many shades of white that can be controlled with a Wi-Fi enabled device.

LIFX Downlight 
The LIFX Downlight is a Wi-Fi enabled trim for a recessed light with millions of colors and many shades of white that can be controlled via a Wi-Fi enabled device.

LIFX+
The LIFX+ is a Wi-Fi enabled LED light bulb with millions of colors and many shades of white that also emits infra-red light to assist security cameras in lighting up dark areas. The bulb can be controlled via a Wi-Fi enabled device and is available in A19 and BR30 shapes.

LIFX Mini 
The LIFX Mini is a Wi-Fi enabled LED light bulb controlled using a Wi-Fi capable device. The bulb has a smaller profile than the company's flagship bulbs. The bulb is 9 watts and produces 800 lumens. The bulb comes in three variants. LIFX Mini Color with millions of colors and thousands of shades of white, LIFX Mini Day & Dusk which outputs only shades of white, and LIFX Mini White which outputs only a 2700K color.

LIFX Z Light Strip 
The LIFX Z light strip is a color-changing, Wi-Fi enabled LED light strip.

LIFX Beam 
The LIFX Beam is a color-changing Wi-Fi enabled light bar.

LIFX Tile

The LIFX Tile is a set of fully integrated illuminated panels that offer millions of colors and many shades of white plus the ability to add animated effects.

LIFX App 
The LIFX app for iOS, Android, Windows 10, watchOS and Android Wear manages and controls LIFX bulbs. LIFX lights can also be controlling using Apple's Siri, Microsoft's Cortana, Google Now, and Amazon's Alexa intelligent personal assistants. LIFX apps for Windows 10 Mobile and Microsoft HoloLens are currently in the works.

Works with LIFX 

IFTTT connects LIFX bulbs with apps such as Facebook, Twitter, The Weather Channel and Google Calendar. It can also connect the lights with the GPS location of a smartphone and motion sensors.

When a Nest Learning Thermostat notices that the home is unoccupied, LIFX bulbs can be configured to switch themselves on and off throughout the day to make it seem like someone is home.

If a Nest Protect detects smoke or carbon monoxide, LIFX bulbs can be configured to provide a visual alert.

When you press Flic, it can turn LIFX lights on or off, change the color and more.

LIFX lights can be controlled using the SmartThings and Logitech Harmony ecosystem.

LIFX light bulbs can be controlled via Amazon echo or echo dot using Alexa voice control to turn on off or dim.

LIFX can be controlled via Google Home device as of March 28, 2017. 

LIFX can be controlled via Microsoft's Cortana as of Feb 16, 2018.

LIFX can be controlled using Mycroft.ai using an installable skill as of 2018-09-12.

References

External links 
 

Home automation companies
Kickstarter-funded products
Companies based in Redwood City, California
Technology companies based in the San Francisco Bay Area
IOS software
WatchOS software
Android (operating system) software
Wear OS software
Windows software
Companies based in Melbourne